The list of shipwrecks in June 1837 includes ships sunk, foundered, wrecked, grounded, or otherwise lost during June 1837.

1 June

2 June

3 June

4 June

5 June

6 June

7 June

8 June

12 June

15 June

17 June

18 June

22 June

23 June

24 June

25 June

26 June

27 June

28 June

Unknown date

References

1837-06